Grantchester Meadows is an open space in Grantchester, to the south of the city of Cambridge. It is part of the broad green flood plain from the pubs in Grantchester to the Ditton Plough, comprising Grantchester Meadows, The Lammas Land, the Backs, Jesus Green, Midsummer Common, and Stourbridge Common.

Grantchester Meadows can be reached by walking across Lammas Land by the River Cam, via the Paradise Local Nature Reserve - a boardwalk through a marsh woodland noted for butterbur and as habitat of the musk beetle, along a residential road (also called Grantchester Meadows), to the river and footpath to Grantchester.

The meadow features in the poem "Watercolor Of Grantchester Meadows" by Sylvia Plath, and a 1969 song by the British rock band Pink Floyd.

As of June 2021, King’s College installed signs which prohibited swimming in the River Cam from Grantchester Meadows. This change was met with controversy. A King's spokesman said: "Sadly it has become increasingly apparent that this not only causes significant problems for the emergency services, but also brings with it a serious risk to life. As such it would be irresponsible for the College to continue to encourage swimming in an area where it is unsafe to do so". Camila Ilsley launched a petition against the closure, criticizing it as a "drastic action" that would "shut down traditions dear to the people of Cambridge, and choke our connection with its beautiful natural surroundings".

References

External links
Cambridge City Council » Parks and playgrounds » Grantchester Meadows

Parks and open spaces in Cambridgeshire
Meadows